Campinho may refer to:
Jorge Fernando Barroso Maciel or Campinho (born 1986), Portuguese footballer
Campinho (Rio de Janeiro), a neighborhood in the North Zone of Rio de Janeiro, Brazil
Campinhos State Park in the state of Paraná, Brazil

See also 
 Campino (disambiguation)